The 1986–87 New Jersey Devils season was the 13th season for the National Hockey League franchise that was established on June 11, 1974, and fifth season since the franchise relocated from Colorado prior to the 1982–83 NHL season. This was the franchise's ninth consecutive season out of the playoffs.

Regular season

 January 22, 1987 - A snowstorm brutally hit New Jersey as the Devils were scheduled to play the Calgary Flames at the Meadowlands. Only 334 fans showed up, making that game the "334 Club" game. To this day, it is the lowest-attended game in modern NHL history, not counting the 2020 NHL return to play playoffs. The Devils went on to win the game 7-5.

Final standings

Schedule and results

Player statistics

Regular season
Scoring

Goaltending

Note: GP = Games played; G = Goals; A = Assists; Pts = Points; +/- = Plus/minus; PIM = Penalty minutes; PPG = Power-play goals; SHG = Short-handed goals; GWG = Game-winning goals
      MIN = Minutes played; W = Wins; L = Losses; T = Ties; GA = Goals against; GAA = Goals against average; SO = Shutouts; SA = Shots against; SV = Shots saved; SV% = Save percentage;

Draft picks
New Jersey's draft picks at the 1986 NHL Entry Draft.

Notes

References

New Jersey Devils seasons
New Jersey Devils
New Jersey Devils
New Jersey Devils
New Jersey Devils
20th century in East Rutherford, New Jersey
Meadowlands Sports Complex